The Vashon-Maury Island Beachcomber is a newspaper based in Vashon in the U.S. state of Washington. It covers local news, sports, business, and community events. The Island Beachcomber publishes once a week on Wednesdays. This newspaper is known for its tabloid-like character, and it is owned by the Black Press Group. 

The Vashon-Maury Island Beachcomber was founded in 1957 and still circulates. In 1958, the Beachcomber purchased another paper, News-Record, merging the two papers. 

In May 2020 Kevin Opsahl, editor of the Vashon-Maury Island Beachcomber, was laid off after being furloughed in March 2020. The Beachcomber is now down to two editorial staff members, reporter Paul Rowley and arts editor Elizabeth Shepherd.

References 

Newspapers published in Washington (state)
King County, Washington